Lawrence Leneir Dawsey (born November 16, 1967) is an American former professional football player who was a wide receiver in the National Football League (NFL) for eight seasons.  Dawsey played college football for the Florida State Seminoles, and was recognized as an All-American.  He was chosen by the Tampa Bay Buccaneers in the third round of the 1991 NFL Draft, and won the UPI NFL-NFC Rookie of the Year award in 1991.

References

External links
 Florida State Seminoles bio

1967 births
Living people
American football wide receivers
Florida State Seminoles football coaches
Florida State Seminoles football players
Miami Dolphins players
New Orleans Saints players
New York Giants players
South Florida Bulls football coaches
Tampa Bay Buccaneers players
All-American college football players
Sportspeople from Dothan, Alabama
Coaches of American football from Alabama
Players of American football from Alabama